Zheleznogorsk is the name of several urban localities in Russia:
Zheleznogorsk, Krasnoyarsk Krai, a town in Krasnoyarsk Krai
Zheleznogorsk, Kursk Oblast, a town in Kursk Oblast

See also
Zheleznogorsk (disambiguation)
Zheleznogorsk-Ilimsky, a town in Nizhneilimsky District of Irkutsk Oblast